The men's 200 metres event at the 1975 Summer Universiade was held at the Stadio Olimpico in Rome on 20 and  21 September.

Medalists

Results

Heats
Wind:Heat 3: 0.0 m/s

Final
Wind: 0.0 m/s

References

Athletics at the 1975 Summer Universiade
1975